Toxicoscordion exaltatum the giant deathcamas, is a North American flowering plant in the genus Toxicoscordion, reputed to be deadly poisonous. It is native to California, Oregon, and Nevada, where it can be found in the Sierra Nevada foothills.

References

External links
Jepson Manual Treatment
Calphotos Photo gallery, University of California @ Berkeley

exaltatum
Flora of California
Flora of Nevada
Flora of Oregon
Flora of the Sierra Nevada (United States)
Plants described in 1906
Flora without expected TNC conservation status